The union territory of Puducherry has five official names, expressing its linguistic diversity, past-French heritage and legacy of British India. French, Tamil, English, Telugu and Malayalam are five official languages of Puducherry. The later two are official only in Yanam and Mahe respectively.

History
French continued to remain as the official language even after the de facto cession of French establishments of India in November 1954. This status quo was maintained after de jure transfer in August 1962 by the Puducherry assembly resolution in 1963 that intended to keep the official status of French albeit include other native languages that are spoken in Puducherry (i.e. Tamil, Telugu and Malayalam) along with Hindi. Owing to anti-Hindi agitations in South India in the subsequent years removed the scenario to include Hindi into the list of official languages and paved way for inclusion of English instead. These agitations had profound impact on the Official language policy of India which guaranteed indefinite use of English along with Hindi. As of today, all the southern states (Andhra Pradesh, Telangana, Tamil Nadu, Karnataka and Kerala) and Puducherry correspond with the Union government and vice versa solely in English.

Names of Puducherry
Puducherry in French is known as Territoire de Pondichéry and the name in the three native languages that are official in the Union territory of Puduchery are given below:

See also
Official languages of Puducherry

References

Footnotes: 
 
 

Languages of India
Official languages of India
India-related lists
 
South India